The 2016 Southern Conference softball tournament was held at UNCG Softball Stadium on the campus of the University of North Carolina at Greensboro in Greensboro, North Carolina, from May 6 through May 14, 2016.  won their eight tournament championship and earned the SoCon's automatic bid to the 2015 NCAA Division I softball tournament. The Championship game was broadcast on ESPN3 while all other games were broadcast on the SoCon Digital Network.

Format
The SoCon Tournament takes the top 7 teams and places them in a double elimination tournament, up until the championship. Seed 1 gets a bye to the 2nd Round. The championship game is played with a winner-take-all single game format.

Tournament

References

Southern Conference Tournament
Southern Conference softball tournament